Semiricinula squamigera is a species of sea snail, a marine gastropod mollusk, in the family Muricidae, the murex snails or rock snails.

Distribution
This marine species occurs off the Sunda Islands, Indonesia.

References

External links
 Deshayes, G. P. (1832-1833). Mollusques. In: Bélanger, C. (ed.) Voyage aux Indes-Orientales, par le nord de l'Europe, les provinces du Caucase, la Géorgie, l'Arménie et la Perse, suivi de détails topographiques, statistiques et autres sur le Pégou, les îles de Java, de Maurice et de Bourbon, sur le Cap-de-Bonne-Espérance et Sainte-Hélène, pendant les années 1825, 1826, 1827, 1828 et 1829. Volume 2, Zoologie. pp. 403-440, 3 pls.

squamigera
Gastropods described in 1832